Beacon's Bottom, also known as Bacon's Bottom, is a hamlet on the A40 between Piddington and Stokenchurch in England. Until 1895 it was administratively part of Oxfordshire, and was transferred to Buckinghamshire with its parent parish Stokenchurch in 1896. It was one of the principal sites of High Wycombe's 19th Century chair-making industry, known locally as bodging.

References

External links

Hamlets in Buckinghamshire